Puranigudam is in the Nagaon district of Assam, India.  There are several villages in Puranigudam. The main commercial center of Puranigudam, also known as Keyan Patti (most of the shops were established by the businessmen from the Marwar area of Rajasthan, India; who were called Keyans in Assamese. The name Keyan Patti comes from that. Patti means inhabitation)  is located closest to Garamur. Rupahihat are to the north, Barhampur and Nagaon in the west, Chalchali in the south and Rongagorah and Samaguri in the east. The river Kolong flowes through the upper half of the area and National Highway 37 runs parallel to the river. The area is almost in the middle of the Nagaon district and situated in higher elevation than the district headquarters.

History 

Puranigudam derives from the Assamese words Purani, or old, and Gudam, or storehouse.  During the colonial period, the headquarters of the district was initially established in Puranigudam, as a result of the Kolong river providing easy access to the area. Storehouses were constructed in the river banks, hence the possible reference in the area name. Later the district headquarters was shifted to present Nagaon.

Notable landmarks 

There are two notable landmarks. The first is the century old minaret located inside the campus of a two hundred year old puranigudam Bor Masjid. The old minaret was built with mortar composed by mixing duck eggs, white sticky rice (bora saul) and split black gram (mati dali).

The other most notable is a statue of Durga Devi, made from Bael wood.  As the folklore goes, more than a century ago, the Durga Puja or, worship of Durga, was celebrated every year in the area and a folk-artist (Lerela Khanikar) used to make the statue of the goddess with mud. After the celebration was over after four days, according to the ritual, the statue was  immersed into the river. This made the artist very sad, and so he made the permanent statue with the Bael wood, which would not be immersed after the celebration was over, but a symbol of the statue (a banana tree) would only be immersed. The statue would be used next year again after re-painting. The same statue is still being used for the yearly celebrations, and few years back the statue had crossed 100 years.

The place is also important for its strategic location, strong cultural background and mixed demography. The area is approx 12 km away from the present district headquarters. During the Assam Movement, a company of Central Reserve Police Force was stationed in the Bapuji Bhawan (a community hall established by the Freedom Fighters of Puranigudam, used mainly for cultural activities). The area comes under Barhampur constituency of Assam Legislative Assembly, from which till now no candidate from Indian national Congress had won the general election. Asom Gana Parishad candidates Dr Girindra Kumar Baruah two-times Assam chief minister Prafulla Kumar Mahanta had been winning for this constituency since 1985 general election.

Demography and inter-religious relationship

The population of the area mainly consists of ethnic Hindu (>60%) and Muslims. There are several other smaller communities also (like the businessmen from Marwar, who are living with peace for last 40–50 years, and most of them speak Assamese; some Ahom population towards south; some tea-tribes and others). The Muslim population is mostly aggregated in Potani Gaon, Na-alimur and in the main business centre.
All the communities are living in peace since long, and there had been no record of any ethnic violence in the area. Even during the religious violence, that broke out in the entire country, after the Demolition of Babri Masjid, the Hindu and Muslims lived without any violence.

Economy 

The economy of the area is mainly dependent on rain fed agriculture. A few attempts at mechanical irrigation have been made but there has been little progress for a variety of reasons.  The main crop is rice, grown only once in a year, due to rain fed nature of the cultivation; and that too with traditional low-yielding varieties, due to lack of awareness among farmers. Sugarcane, Jute, pulses, Rapeseed and Mustard, some vegetables and fruits are also grown, mostly for local consumption. Due to the presence of large number of omnivorous wild monkeys, extent of cultivation of vegetables and fruits are also decreasing.

There are a few marshy areas, some private fresh-water ponds and the Kolong river, as the source of the fishes, which are also mostly used to fulfill the local demands. Few broiler-chicken farms, established in private basis, also supply some part of the demand for animal protein. Although there are a few small piggeries, there are no large scale egg-laying chicken farms and dairy farms.

In last few decades, in line with the entire state, with increase in population and unemployment, the economy and living standards are declining.

Culture and important personalities 

The area has produced teachers like  Madhab Chandra Borah, social activists Late Chandra Kamal Borah, and film and media personalities like Nip Kumar Baruah(Reporter, News Live) & Nilutpal Borah(Reporter, News Time Assam).

Accessibility 

Puranigudam is easily accessible from the district headquarters and any other part through the Nation Highway no. 37; which is also said to be the artery of Assam, stretching through the state from one to the other end. The nearest airport is LGB airport, in Guwahati (~130 km away). There is a train station in Puranigudam and one can catch the morning inter-city train to Guwahati, which goes back in the evening from Guwahati.

Some Important Personality 

Late Birinchi Kumar Barua, Late Debakanta Barooah (Poet, Writer & Politician),Late Madhab Chandra Borah(Freedom Fighter & Writer), Krishna Goswami(Writer), Bapon Chandra Barooah (National President Award Recipient Educationist), Fanindra Nath Gayan (Writer), Late Chandra Kamal Borah (Social Worker). Late Narendra Nath Hazarika was a father figure for Puranigudam. His contributions towards freedom movement was immense. He was also sent to jail during the Freedom Movement for showing black flag to the British Army. He was  the only representative from Nagaon to attend crucial Lahore  Congress Meet. His followers, including Late Madhab Chandra Borah(Freedom Fighter), Mohan Das ( teacher), late Badan Khaund, Haladhar Bhuyan and Purna Sarma were the key activists of the Freedom Movement.

Education 

Dr. Birinchi Kumar Barooah College and Radha Kanta Barooah H.S. School are the two prominent educational institutions in this area. Late Narendra Nath Hazarika was a prominent freedom fighter, who played a key role during the freedom movement, was closely associated with setting up schools and Puranigudam Bapuji Hall & Library.

Health care 

There is a Primary Health Center in Puranigudam business center, run by the state government. There are also few physicians practicing privately; but there are no full-fledged hospital/ nursing home in the area.

There was a public sponsored drinking water supply scheme established long before in Na-alimur. It was almost defunct for quite some time; which has been renovated recently, and has started working. But the exact mechanism of its functioning is not known to all.

Cities and towns in Nagaon district